An accelerator physicist is a scientist who contributes to the field of Accelerator physics, involving the fundamental physical mechanisms underlying beams of charged particles accelerated to high energies and the structures and materials needed to do so. In addition to developing and applying such basic theoretical models, an accelerator physicist contributes to the design, operation and optimization of particle accelerators.

Significant accelerator physicists  
 John Cockcroft
 Ernest Courant
 Helen T. Edwards
 Donald William Kerst
 Ernest Lawrence
 Carlo Rubbia
 Ernest Rutherford
 Andrew Sessler
 Robert Van de Graaff
 Simon van der Meer
 Ernest Walton
 Rolf Widerøe

See Also
Accelerator physics

List of particle accelerators

References

Accelerator physics